Herly is a commune in the Pas-de-Calais department in the Hauts-de-France region of France.

Geography
A village situated some 14 miles (22 km) northeast of Montreuil-sur-Mer on the D156 road.

Population

Places of interest

 The church of St. Peter, dating from the seventeenth century.
 The seventeenth century priory and chapel

See also
Communes of the Pas-de-Calais department

References

Communes of Pas-de-Calais